Lou Schuler (born January 23, 1957 in St. Louis, Missouri) is a fitness journalist and author or coauthor of several books on men's health and exercise. In 2004 he won a National Magazine Award for Death by Exercise.

Schuler is currently the editorial director for the Personal Trainer Development Center. He's the former fitness editor of Men's Fitness magazine, the former fitness director of Men’s Health, the former editorial director of the online publication Testosterone Muscle (also known as T-Nation), and is certified as a strength and conditioning specialist (CSCS) by the National Strength and Conditioning Association.

Schuler participated in JP Fitness Summit 2007 and Staley Training Systems Annual Training Summit 2006, on both occasions presenting lectures on the way of becoming a successful sports writer.

Early life 
Schuler spent his college life lifeguarding.

Books

References

Further reading

External links
Lou Schuler's Official website
Death by Exercise in pdf format
Lou Schuler's interview from Testosterone Nation

1957 births
Living people
People from St. Louis
Strength training writers
American male non-fiction writers